Jujubinus hernandezi is a species of sea snail, a marine gastropod mollusk in the family Trochidae, the top snails.

Description

Distribution
This species occurs in the Atlantic Ocean off the Canary Islands.

References

External links
 

hernandezi
Gastropods described in 2009